The 2020 Supersport World Championship was the twenty-fourth season of the Supersport World Championship, the twenty-second held under this name.

Race calendar and results
Due to the coronavirus pandemic, the Qatar round was postponed to an unannounced date and the Jerez, Assen, Aragon and Misano rounds were rescheduled to a later date, while the Imola and Oschersleben rounds were cancelled. As a result of updates made to the MotoGP calendar for the same reason, the French round date was also affected. Despite having already been rescheduled, the Assen round was later postponed to a to-be-determined date, along with the Donington round.

On 19 June, an updated calendar was published; for the restart, Jerez and Portimão were brought forward from their respective dates and a second round at Aragon was added to the schedule. Other five rounds—the first at Aragon, as well as Barcelona, Magny-Cours, San Juan and Misano—either kept their original or revised dates, although the latter two events were labelled as 'to be confirmed'. Three rounds—Losail, Donington and Assen—were included without a confirmed date and were subsequently cancelled on 24 July. The San Juan round was cancelled on the 13 August whilst the Misano round was cancelled and replaced by a round in Estoril on 18 August.

Along with the calendar, the event timetable was also revised, as an additional race to be held on Saturday was added to each remaining weekend.

Entry list

All entries used Pirelli tyres.

Championship standings
Points

Riders' championship

Manufacturers' championship

Notes

References

External links 

Supersport
Supersport
Supersport World Championship seasons